Tater Peeler was an unincorporated community in Wilson County, Tennessee.

References

Unincorporated communities in Wilson County, Tennessee
Unincorporated communities in Tennessee